Tylerton is an unincorporated community located on Smith Island in Somerset County, Maryland, United States.  Tylerton can be accessed via a ferry from Crisfield, Maryland. It is a waterman village of 50 residents. Attractions in the community include the Inn of Silent Music and The Drum Point Market, which sells beverages, homemade Smith Island cakes, crab cakes and other Chesapeake Bay specialties. The Chesapeake Bay Foundation's Smith Island Study Center is located in Tylerton.

History and language
British settlers arrived on the island in the 17th century, arriving from Cornwall, Wales, and Dorset via Virginia.

The community features a local dialect which is derived from the dialects of the West Country of England and the dialect of Cornwall. The dialect contains some relict features indicative of its origins. This dialect is similar to the Ocracoke Brogue, sometimes referred to as the Outer Banks Brogue.

The Island Belle, a former passenger ferry to the island, was listed on the National Register of Historic Places in 1979.

References

External links
 Chesapeake Bay Foundation's Smith Island Study Center website

Crabbing communities in Maryland
Fishing communities in Maryland
Unincorporated communities in Somerset County, Maryland
Smith Island, Maryland
Unincorporated communities in Maryland
Maryland populated places on the Chesapeake Bay